400 Blows were a British industrial/post punk band founded in 1981.

History
400 Blows was formed in Croydon, South London by Edward Beer in 1981 along with two friends, Alexander Fraser and Rob. Their debut single was released on their own Concrete Productions record label in 1982. In 1983 they were signed to the Illuminated label and subsequently released an album, "...if I kissed her I'd have to kill her first..." (a quote from serial killer Edmund Kemper to his sister, who was teasing him about wanting to kiss his teacher).  In 1985 they released a single, "Movin'", described by Adrian Thrills in the New Musical Express as 'a spiked reworking of the 1976 Brass Construction dance classic'. It reached 54 in the UK Singles Chart. By this time the line up was Beer, Anthony Thorpe, and Lea, formerly the female half of the duo Tom Boy. 

Thorpe went on to run the Language record label.

Discography

Albums
"The Good Clean English Fist" (1985), Illuminated Entertainment
"...if I kissed her I'd have to kill her first..." (1985), Illuminated Entertainment - UK Indie No. 3
Look (1986)
The New Lords on the Block (1989), Concrete Productions
The Jealous Guy (2006)

Singles
"Beat the Devil" (1982), Concrete Productions
"Return of the Dog" (1983), Illuminated
"Declaration of Intent" (1984), Illuminated - UK Indie No. 24
"Pressure" (1984), Illuminated - UK Indie No. 27
"Groove Jumping" (1984), Illuminated - UK Indie No. 22
"Breakdown" / "Jive 69" (1985), Illuminated
"Runaway" / "Breakdown" (1985), Illuminated
"Movin'" (1985), Illuminated - UK No. 54, UK Indie No. 3
G.I. (1986), Saderal - with 23 Skidoo, UK Indie No. 15
Let the Music Play EP (1986), Illuminated
"Champion Sound" (1991), Warrior
"Play Like a Human" (1991), Warrior
"Tension Release" (1992), Warrior

Compilations
The Good Clean English Fist (1985), Dojo - UK Indie No. 17
Yesterday, Today, Tomorrow, Forever (1989), Concrete Productions

References

External links
Discography at Tigersushi
Discography at Discogs

English new wave musical groups
English post-punk music groups